Galatian  may refer to:

 Galatians (people)
 Galatian language

See also
 Galatia
 Galatia (Roman province)
 Galatians (disambiguation)

Language and nationality disambiguation pages